John Pomeroy is an animator.

John Pomeroy may also refer to:

John Norton Pomeroy, American lawyer
John Pomeroy (British Army officer)
John Pomeroy (died 1416), MP for Totnes